The bushveld pipit (Anthus caffer), also known as bush pipit or  little pipit, is a species of bird in the pipit and wagtail family Motacillidae. It is found in Angola, Botswana, Eswatini, Ethiopia, Kenya, Malawi, Mozambique, South Africa, Tanzania, Zambia, and Zimbabwe. Its natural habitats are subtropical or tropical dry forests and dry savanna.

Gallery

References

External links
Image at ADW

 Bushveld pipit  - Species text in The Atlas of Southern African Birds.

Anthus
Birds of Southern Africa
Birds described in 1851
Taxonomy articles created by Polbot